Anhammus aberrans is a species of beetle in the family Cerambycidae. It was described by Ritsema in 1881. It is known from Borneo and Malaysia.

References

Lamiini
Beetles described in 1881